Mara (also Romanized as Marā’) is a village in Tarrud Rural District of the Central District of Damavand County, Tehran province, Iran. At the 2006 National Census, its population was 815 in 238 households. The following census in 2011 counted 855 people in 247 households. The latest census in 2016 showed a population of 1,081 people in 359 households; it was the largest village in its rural district.

References 

Damavand County

Populated places in Tehran Province

Populated places in Damavand County